The Chief of Home Guard, also called the Chief of the National Swedish Home Guard (RiksHvC) is the Swedish Home Guard chief representative. He reports to the Chief of Armed Forces Training & Procurement. The Home Guard function and its development are the responsibility of the Chief of Home Guard and as support in his work at the Swedish Armed Forces Headquarters he has the staff of the Home Guard Department (Rikshemvärnsavdelningen). The Chief of Home Guard with staff (the Home Guard Department, PROD RIKSHV) is part of the Training & Procurement Staff.

Tasks
The Chief of Home Guard leads the implementation of the National Home Guard Combat School and the training units' mission activities relating to the Home Guard's operations and he inspects the Home Guard units. The Chief of Home Guard is also the chairman of the Home Guard Council (Rikshemvärnsrådet), the central co-influence body of the Home Guard; a council that is chosen at the National Home Guard Council (Rikshemvärnstinget) every other year.

Since 30 January 2020, the following units are subordinated to the Chief of Home Guard: National Home Guard Combat School, Northern Military Region, Central Military Region, Western Military Region, Southern Military Region.

Coat of arms
The coat of arms of the National Home Guard Staff (Rikshemvärnsstaben, Rikshvst) 1994–1948, National Home Guard Center (Rikshemvärnscentrum, RiksHvC) 1994–2000, and the Chief of Home Guard with the Home Guard Department within the Swedish Armed Forces Headquarters (Rikshemvärnschefen med rikshemvärnsavdelningen inom HKV) 2000–present. Blazon: "Azure, the badge of the Home Guard, three crowns, placed two and one, above the letter H, all or. The shield surmounted two swords in saltire or".

Chiefs

Chiefs of Home Guard

|-style="text-align:center;"
!colspan=8|Chief of Home Guard (Hemvärnschef)

|-style="text-align:center;"
!colspan=8|Chief of the National Swedish Home Guard (Rikshemvärnschef)

Deputy Chiefs of Home Guard

Footnotes

References

Notes

Print

Web

External links
 

Military appointments of Sweden